In mathematics, a principal n-th root of unity (where n is a positive integer) of a ring is an element  satisfying the equations

 

In an integral domain, every primitive n-th root of unity is also a principal -th root of unity. In any ring, if n is a power of 2, then any n/2-th root of −1 is a principal n-th root of unity.

The significance of a root of unity being principal is that it is a necessary condition for the theory of the discrete Fourier transform to work out correctly.

References

Algebraic numbers
Cyclotomic fields
Polynomials
1 (number)
Complex numbers